SIX may refer to:

Computing
Seattle Internet Exchange
SIX Swiss Exchange
Slovak Internet eXchange
Slovenian Internet Exchange
Swiss Internet Exchange

Finance
SIX Financial Information, a subsidiary of SIX Group
SIX Group, a financial service provider in Switzerland
SIX Interbank Clearing, in Zurich, Switzerland, a subsidiary of SIX Group

Television
SIX (Sports Channel)
Six (TV series), an American television drama series
Six TV, the sixth free to air terrestrial television channel in the UK

Other
Six (musical), stylized as SIX

See also 
 6 (disambiguation)